Meroo may refer to:

 Meroo National Park, New South Wales, Australia
 Meroo River, New South Wales, Australia
 Meroo, Leh, a village in India